Kabaddi Kabaddi is a 2015 Nepali romantic comedy  film directed by Ram Babu Gurung. The film stars Dayahang Rai, Saugat Malla and Rishma Gurung. It is a sequel to the  2014 film Kabaddi. It was one of the highest-grossing films in Nepal at the time of its release. It was followed by a sequel named Kabaddi Kabaddi Kabaddi which was also a blockbuster at the box office. The final sequel, Kabaddi 4: The Final Match, was released on 27 May 2022.

Background
Kabaddi Kabaddi is produced by Cinema Art Pvt. Ltd and presented by Black Horse Pictures. The film is a Nepali social drama and romantic comedy. It features Dayahang Rai, Saugat Malla, Rishma Gurung, Bijay Baral, Buddhi Tamang, Maotse Gurung, Upendra Subba, Shisheer Bangdel, Pushkar Gurung, Kabita Ale, Birmaya Gurung, Aruna Karki Pokhrel, Pashupati Rai, Junu Bista, Mani Ram Pokhrel and Kamal Mani Nepal.
The film is directed by Ram Babu Gurung and the producers are Raunak Bikram Kandel and Om Chand Rauniyar. It's written by Ram Babu Gurung himself and Upendra Subba and the cinematography is done by Shailendra D. Karki. The film's music is composed by Kali Prasad Baskota with art direction by Suresh Karki and Hom BC and editing by Nimesh Shrestha.

Plot
Kabaddi gave a story of the unrequited love of Kaji (Dayahang Rai) for his soulmate Maiya last year. As it was a good film with ample humor, the thoroughly entertaining film got all the love from the audience. One year has passed in Naurikot, Mustang and Kaji are back with Kabaddi Kabaddi. His love for Maiya has not changed, but Maiya is no different. She doesn't reciprocate her feeling. She has a new admirer, Kaji's rival—Bum Kaji. Both the Kajis compete with each other to win Maiya. The nearly two-hour-long entertaining journey unveils the winner.

Kabaddi Kabaddi is the continued story of Kabaddi's Kaji and Maiya. Retelling the same unrequited love story and romance of the two could have been dull but Rambabu Gurung has written the story brilliantly and articulately, and with intrigue and has directed with the same passion. As such the story has evolved along with the characters. The screenplay by director Rambabu Gurung and Upendra Subba is also noteworthy.

The character of Bum Kaji, politics and sub-plots of Kaji's two friends with tidbits of music and action has been mixed into the love story.

Also, the message of how politics works and how a husband and wife should be is nuanced. 

However, there are a few things that don't add up. Maiya is the same and hasn't matured despite going through a lot in the first film. Bibek's character (Nischal Basnet) again makes an appearance as Bum Kaji's friend but their relationship hasn't been explored to rest the curiosity of the audience. Perhaps, there is room for another Kabaddi film.

Kabaddi Kabaddi poster Maiya has less screen presence but has done fine as a chirpy village girl. Meanwhile, Bijay Baral and Buddhi Tamang, who play Kaji's friends, have complimented the film.

Malla as Bum Kaji is the icing on the cake. The brilliant actor has pulled off his quirky character of a musician who is also a lover boy. He has shown great comic timing.

Nonetheless, the film's USP is humour—right from the first scene where one of Kaji's friends is writing a love letter for Kaji with blood (of chicken!) to Maiya while another friend roasts the same chicken with the beautiful backdrop of mountains till the end of the film. Humour is not just limited to dialogues and activities but expressions and demeanour. The take on humour is very natural and has the touch of everyday life which makes the scenes more relevant.

Cast
Dayahang Rai as Kaji
Saugat Malla as Bam Kaji
Rishma Gurung as Maiya 
Bijay Baral as Bir Kaji/B.K.
Buddhi Tamang  as Chhantyal
Maotse Gurung as Bom's Father
Upendra Subba as Jhakri
Sishir Bangdel as Kaji's Father
Pushkar Gurung
Kabita Ale as Kaji's Mother
Birmaya Gurung
Aruna Karki Pokhrel as Maiya's Mother
Pashupati Rai
Junu Bista as Bijay's Girlfriend 
Mani Ram Pokhrel
Kamal Mani Nepal
Samten Bhutia
Nischal Basnet (cameo)
Priyanka Karki (cameo)
Srijana Subba (special appearance at end)

Songs

Awards

References

External links 
 Kabaddi Kabaddi Box Office Collection - Opening Day
 Kabaddi Kabaddi Different cities in Nepal

2015 films
Nepalese romantic comedy films
Films shot in Kathmandu
Films produced by Nischal Basnet
Nepalese sequel films